Prosopocera undulata is a species of beetle in the family Cerambycidae. It was described by Schwarzer in 1929. It is known from Tanzania and Malawi.

References

Prosopocerini
Beetles described in 1929